Marching Band is a musical duo consisting of Erik Sunbring and Jacob Lind from Linköping, Sweden.

History
In 2008, the band released Spark Large, their first full-length album on U & L Records. Music from the album received radio airplay in Los Angeles when tracks from the debut surfaced on KCRW and KDLD. In the months to follow, their music was featured on World Cafe, Second Stage, and Song of the Day. Marching Band was also featured in BillboardUnderground.

Marching Band songs have been featured in Zombieland, Nick & Norah's Infinite Playlist, 90210, How I Met Your Mother, Scrubs, Cougar Town, and Greek.

Marching Band’s second album, Pop Cycle, was released in May of 2010 on U & L Records.

Marching Band’s debut album was recorded in Los Angeles with Adam Lasus (Clap Your Hands Say Yeah, Yo La Tengo). Their sophomore album, Pop Cycle was recorded in Stockholm with Swedish producer Jari Haapalainen (Ed Harcourt, Camera Obscura, The Concretes).

Marching Band's song "Aggravate" was included on the indie compilation Indiecater Volume IV in August 2009.

Marching Band's EP, 'Pop Cycle Naked - EP' was released November 9, 2010 on U & L Records.

Marching Band's new EP, "And I've Never Seen Anything Like That", will be released on Jan 15, 2013. MTV debuted the band's music video "And I've Never",

Marching Band's, third full length "So Much Imagine", was released on Feb 21, 2014 digitally and as a double Vinyl containing 21 new tracks.

Members
Erik Sunbring - Guitars, Vocals
Jacob Lind - Guitars, Keyboards, Vocals

Supplemental Musicians
Benjamin Forsberg - Guitars, Vocals
Ludvig Kennberg - Drums
Gustaf Nygren - Bass

Releases

Albums
EP 1 as Second Language - 2004
EP 2 as Second Language - 2005
EP 3 - 2006
Spark Large - 2008, U & L Records, Inc.
Pop Cycle - 2010, U & L Records, Inc.
Pop Cycle Naked - EP - 2010, U & L Records, Inc.
And I've Never Seen Anything Like That - EP - 2013, U & L Records, Inc.
So Much Imagine - 2014, UNC Records (Europe), U & L Records, Inc. (North America), And Records (Japan)
Heart Jewel - 2016, And Records.

References

NPR Second Stage
NPR World Cafe
Pitchfork Review on May 15th, 2008
 Record Label
 Indiecater Volume IV
 MTV "And I've Never"

External links
 Official Site 

Swedish rock music groups